Riza Shahriz bin Abdul Aziz, better known as Riza Aziz, is a Malaysian film producer and the co-founder of Red Granite Pictures, a Los Angeles-based film production company.

Career

Riza holds a BS degree in Government & Economics and an MS in Politics from the London School of Economics. He worked with the management consultants KPMG for two years until 2002 and then at HSBC London from 2005 until the financial crash in 2008.

In 2010, with producing partner Joey McFarland, Riza co-founded Red Granite Pictures, an American film finance, development, production and distribution company. Aziz serves as both a producer and chairman for the independent company and started its slate with the hit romantic comedy, Friends with Kids Written and directed by Jennifer Westfeldt, Friends With Kids also stars Jon Hamm, Adam Scott, Kristen Wiig, Maya Rudolph and Chris O'Dowd.

In 2012, following the success of Friends With Kids, Riza went on to executive produce the dramatic thriller Out of the Furnace, starring Christian Bale, Casey Affleck, Zoe Saldana, and Forest Whitaker. Scott Cooper of Crazy Heart directed the feature which was released on December 6, 2013.  Riza followed up Out of the Furnace with the highly anticipated film The Wolf of Wall Street. The Wolf of Wall Street is based upon Jordan Belfort's best-selling novel of the same name and was adapted into a screenplay by Terence Winter. The film starred Leonardo DiCaprio, Margot Robbie, Jonah Hill, and was directed by Martin Scorsese. The film was released on December 25, 2013. The film is banned in his native country, Malaysia. The Wolf of Wall Street has achieved tremendous box office success and critical acclaim - including a Golden Globe win for Best Actor in a Motion Picture Comedy for star Leonardo DiCaprio and five Academy Award nominations including Best Picture, Best Actor and Best Director.

Also in 2013, Riza completed production on Horns, a supernatural thriller starring Daniel Radcliffe, Juno Temple and directed by Alexandre Aja. The film is based on the best-selling novel by Joe Hill and was released in 2014 by Dimension-RADiUS. Riza is also a producer on the film Dumb and Dumber To, a sequel to the 1995 film Dumb and Dumber, directed by Pete and Bobby Farrelly and starring Jim Carrey and Jeff Daniels reprising their roles as Lloyd Christmas and Harry Dunne, respectively. It was released on November 14, 2014, by Universal Pictures and opened number one at the box office. Paramount Pictures and Riza's production company Red Granite Pictures in association with Gary Sanchez Productions also produced the Will Ferrell and Mark Wahlberg comedy Daddy's Home. Red Granite Pictures co-produced and co-financed the film, which Paramount Pictures distributed worldwide. Riza's development slate includes The Brigands of Rattleborge and The General. The Brigands of Rattleborge, blacklist's number 1 script of 2006, is a western revenge story, and The General is a gritty look at the story of George Washington.

In 2011, Variety named Riza to their list of Top 10 Producers to Watch.

Personal life
Riza was born to Abdul Aziz Nong Chik and Rosmah Mansor in Malaysia. His mother married politician Najib Razak (who would later serve as Prime Minister of Malaysia) in 1987, making him Najib Razak's stepson. His sister, also born to Abdul Aziz Nong Chik and Rosmah Mansor, is Azrene.

1MDB scandal
 
As of September 2015 the US Department of Justice was investigating property transactions carried out by Riza, related to the role of Najib Razak, in 1Malaysia Development Berhad (1MDB) scandal in Malaysia. On 20 July 2016, Riza Aziz was named in FBI's 1MDB lawsuit. Tens of millions of dollars in funds diverted from 1MDB were used to produce the 2013 Martin Scorsese film 'The Wolf of Wall Street', the lawsuits said. Later, it was revealed that Dumb and Dumber To and Daddy's Home were also financed by Malaysian government investment fund through corrupt officials and financiers.

In March 2018, Red Granite Pictures agreed to pay US$60 million to the U.S. Justice Department to settle claims it financed three films, Wolf of Wall Street, Daddy's Home, and Dumb and Dumber To using over US$100 million funds sourced from 1MDB.

Riza is also known as a good friend of Low Taek Jho. Low allegedly masterminded the 1MDB scandal, allegedly acquiring assets (including luxury paintings, a superyacht, and several real estate assets, among others) using monies allegedly siphoned from the fund.

Riza's involvement in the 1MDB scandal is under investigation by the Malaysian Anti-Corruption Commission (MACC). In July 2019, Riza was arrested on money laundering charges stemming from the MACC investigation.

Filmography

References

External links 
 
 Riza Aziz Official Website

American entertainment industry businesspeople
Living people
American film producers
Malaysian expatriates in the United States
Alumni of the London School of Economics
Malaysian people of Malay descent
Malaysian people of Minangkabau descent
Year of birth missing (living people)